Tanapat Na Tarue (born July 3, 1981), simply known as Beer, is a Thai retired professional footballer who played as a defensive midfielder.

Honours

Bangkok United
 Thai Premier League: 2006
Muangthong United
 Thai Premier League: 2009

External links
 Profile at Goal

1981 births
Living people
Tanapat Na Tarue
Tanapat Na Tarue
Association football midfielders
Tanapat Na Tarue
Tanapat Na Tarue
Tanapat Na Tarue
Tanapat Na Tarue
Tanapat Na Tarue
Tanapat Na Tarue
Tanapat Na Tarue
Tanapat Na Tarue
Tanapat Na Tarue